I'll Give a Million is a 1938 American romance film directed by Walter Lang. It is a remake of the Italian film Darò un milione (1935).

Plot
In the south of France, wealthy American businessman Tony Newlander is fed up with life. It seems everyone is friendly with him only because of his money or influence, including his ex-wife Cecilia and his valet.

While on his yacht, he spots Louie, a tramp drowning in the water. Unable to attract the crew's attention over the sound of the ship's whistle, Tony jumps in to rescue him. The yacht sails away, so Tony drags a strangely uncooperative Louie ashore. It turns out that Louie was trying to commit suicide. However, since he has been saved, he desists from trying again. Louie takes him to his shack on the beach.

The next morning, the tramp discovers that Tony has taken Louie's clothes and left his tuxedo and money behind in exchange. Louie dresses up in his new finery and goes to a cafe for breakfast. The proprietor thinks he stole the money he flashes. Louie insists that an eccentric millionaire, dressed like a tramp, gave him a million francs and will do the same to anyone who is kind to him in his disguise. A reporter publishes his story, and soon everyone is being extra generous to anybody who looks down on his luck.

Meanwhile, Tony encounters a mischievous chimpanzee named Darwin. Jean Hofmann, a performer at the Circus Primerose, enlists Tony to capture Darwin. The chimp indulges in a favorite pastime, setting off a fire alarm. Tony is blamed for the rash of phony alarms, taken into custody and sentenced to ten days in jail. However, after the judge reads the newspaper article, he lets Tony go.

Tony flips a borrowed coin, which sends him to the circus. Jean gets Anatole Primerose, the proprietor, to give him a job as a relief night watchman.

Meanwhile, tramps flood the region to take advantage of the situation. Soon there are complaints, and the newspaper editor is pressured to either produce the millionaire or retract the story. He in turn threatens to accuse Louie of murdering the millionaire and stealing his money and gives him one last chance to find the man. The police round up all the tramps in town for Louie to look over.

Tony and Jean start falling in love, but to stop Max, the jealous son of the proprietor, from getting Tony fired, Jean lies (so she thinks) and tells him she is being friendly to Tony only because he is the millionaire. Unfortunately, Tony overhears her.

To save himself from a possible charge of murder, Louie identifies a tramp at random as the millionaire: Kopelpeck. Disillusioned, Tony decides to end the charade and expose the imposter, but no one will believe him. In fact, he is thrown in jail for making a nuisance of himself. Jean bails him out. Then Tony discovers that Jean does not believe he is the millionaire. His identity is finally confirmed by the captain of his yacht and others. The public surrounds the police station, demanding to be compensated for their misguided efforts. To prevent a riot, Tony agrees to donate half a million to the poor and the same amount to the city, but only if Jean will marry him. She holds out for a while, but then gives in.

Cast

 Warner Baxter as Tony Newlander
 Marjorie Weaver as Jean Hofmann
 Peter Lorre as Louie 'The Dope' Monteau
 Jean Hersholt as Victor
 John Carradine as Kopelpeck
 J. Edward Bromberg as Editor
 Lynn Bari as Cecelia
 Fritz Feld as Max Primerose
 Sig Ruman as Anatole Primerose
 Christian Rub as Commissionaire
 Paul Harvey as Corcoran
 Charles Halton as Mayor
 Frank Reicher as Prefect of Police
 Frank Dawson as Albert
 Harry Hayden as Gilman
 Stanley Andrews as Captain
 Lillian Porter as Flower Girl
 Luis Alberni as Reporter
 Rafaela Ottiano as Proprietress
 Georges Renavent as Gendarme
 Rolfe Sedan as Telegraph Clerk
 Eddie Conrad as Proprietor of Pastry Shop
 Egon Brecher as Citizen
 Frank Puglia as Citizen
 Michael Visaroff as Citizen
 Alex Novinsky as Citizen
 Armand Kaliz as Hotel Manager

References

External links
 
 

1938 films
1930s romance films
American black-and-white films
American remakes of Italian films
American romance films
Circus films
Films directed by Walter Lang
Films scored by Cyril J. Mockridge
Films set on the French Riviera
20th Century Fox films
1930s English-language films
1930s American films
Films based on works by Cesare Zavattini